Jonathan "Jony" Fragnoli (born 31 January 1989) is a Swiss football player who plays for Vidago FC. He also holds Portuguese citizenship.

Club career
He made his professional debut in the Segunda Liga for Santa Clara on 21 December 2014 in a game against Trofense.

References

External links

1989 births
Living people
People from Chaves, Portugal
Swiss people of Portuguese descent
Swiss men's footballers
Swiss expatriate footballers
G.D. Chaves players
Padroense F.C. players
FC Porto players
C.F. Fão players
G.D. Tourizense players
C.D. Santa Clara players
SC Mirandela players
Liga Portugal 2 players
GD Bragança players
Merelinense F.C. players
F.C. Vizela players
C.D.C. Montalegre players
Association football midfielders
Swiss expatriate sportspeople in Spain
Expatriate footballers in Spain